Loi Wai Hong  is a Macanese footballer who plays as a defender for Benfica Macau.

References 

Living people
1992 births
Macau footballers
Macau international footballers
Association football defenders